Georg Johansson (23 April 1910 – 12 January 1996) was a Swedish football forward who played for the Swedish national football team. He was a reserve in the 1934 FIFA World Cup. He also played for IK Brage.

References

Swedish footballers
Sweden international footballers
Association football forwards
Allsvenskan players
IK Brage players
1934 FIFA World Cup players
1910 births
1996 deaths